Tropical Storm Alex was a strong tropical cyclone that caused flash flooding in western Cuba and South Florida while developing into the first named storm of the 2022 Atlantic hurricane season. Alex originated from a broad area of low pressure partially related to the remnants of Hurricane Agatha in the Eastern Pacific. The National Hurricane Center (NHC) initiated advisories on it as Potential Tropical Cyclone One over the eastern Yucatán Peninsula on June 2. Wind shear and dry air kept the system disorganized until after it crossed Florida two days later. Finally, on June 5, the system became sufficiently organized and was named Alex while located north of Grand Bahama Island. The storm brought rain and strong winds to Bermuda on June 6, before becoming a post-tropical cyclone that same day. Alex formed four days after the official start of the season, making the 2022 Atlantic hurricane season the first since 2014 not to have a pre-season named storm. 

There were no reports of damage or casualties associated with Alex while it was a tropical storm. Its precursor disturbance, however, flooded streets and caused numerous power outages in Florida. And in Cuba it caused flooding and mudslides, which killed four people, damaged dozens of homes and knocked out electricity in various areas.

Meteorological history

On May 31, a large low-pressure area developed near the Yucatán Peninsula, partially related to the Pacific basin remnants of Hurricane Agatha interacting with an upper-level trough over the Gulf of Mexico. The low produced a large area of disorganized showers and thunderstorms as it moved across the Yucatán over the ensuing few days. Around this time, surface observations and satellite imagery noted that the system remained disorganized due to southwesterly wind shear, with deep convection displaced from the estimated center.

Early on the following day, Hurricane hunters estimated that the system was producing tropical storm-force winds and reported a low-level wind shift, but found no conclusive evidence of a closed circulation. Scatterometer data early on June 4 indicated the system had an elongated region of light winds and still lacked a well-defined center. Shortly after 12:00 UTC, the system struck the west coast of Florida between Cape Coral and Naples. After moving into the Atlantic later on June 4, the system's circulation became better defined,

After peaking, it weakened slightly and began to lose its tropical characteristics. Then, 12 hours later, the cyclone was absorbed within a baroclinic zone. A few hours later however, a new area of low pressure formed in association with the deepening trough. And, energized by Alex's remnants, it soon was producing hurricane-force winds as it moved over the central Atlantic, On June 10–11, the new low passed between Iceland and the northern coast of the United Kingdom near the Faroe Islands. Then, it rapidly weakened while moving toward Norway which it reached on June 13.

Preparations and impact

Cuba
Upon the initiation of advisories on Potential Tropical Cyclone One at 21:00 UTC on June 2 the government of Cuba issued a tropical storm watch for Artemisa, La Habana, Matanzas, Mayabeque, and Pinar del Rio provinces, as well as Isla de la Juventud. The government reported that up to 4,480 people had been displaced in the province. The rains caused the Cuyaguateje River to overflow its banks, in what some longtime residents of Camino Verde, in the municipality of Guane, described as the worst flooding since Hurricane Alberto in 1982. In La Habana, rains caused 61 landslides around Havana. Altogether, there were four storm related fatalities reported in Cuba: two in the Pinar del Río Province and two in Havana. Approximately 750 homes suffered varying degrees of damage, 21 of which were destroyed, and 158,000 customers lost power. Roughly  of crops were damaged.

Florida
The NHC began posting tropical storm watches for Florida, encompassing the state's west coast south of Longboat Key, the east coast from the Brevard–Volusia county line southward, Lake Okeechobee, Florida Bay, and the entirety of the Florida Keys. In addition, parts of South Florida were put under a flash flood warning. Likewise, South Florida also experienced heavy rains in association with the precursor of Alex. Consequently, street flooding occurred in South Florida, especially from Miami-Dade County to southern Palm Beach County, leading to a few road closures and stalling cars, necessitating the rescue of several stranded motorists via the Miami-Dade Fire Rescue Department. The precursor to Alex also generated tropical storm-force wind gusts in the Miami metropolitan area, causing a combined 3,543 power outages in Broward and Miami-Dade counties. In Pompano Beach, winds toppled a large tree onto a mobile home, rendering the residence uninhabitable. Damages across the state from the disturbance totaled $104,000.

The Bahamas 
The Government of the Bahamas issued a tropical storm watch and then a tropical storm warning for its northwestern islands. The Bermuda Weather Service issued a tropical storm watch for Bermuda, which was raised to a tropical storm warning as the system approached.

See also

Weather of 2022
Timeline of the 2022 Atlantic hurricane season
Tropical cyclones in 2022
Other storms named Alex
Tropical Storm Alberto (2006)
Tropical Storm Barry (2007)
Tropical Storm Debby (2012)
Tropical Storm Andrea (2013)
Tropical Storm Colin (2016)

References

External links

 The National Hurricane Center's advisory archive on Tropical Storm Alex

2022 Atlantic hurricane season
Hurricanes in Florida
Atlantic tropical storms
Tropical cyclones in 2022
2022 in Cuba
Hurricanes in Cuba
2022 meteorology
Hurricanes in Bermuda